Boomerang is a 1976 French-Italian crime film starring Alain Delon,  Carla Gravina and Charles Vanel and directed by José Giovanni.

It recorded admissions of 787,208 in France.

Plot

Cast 
 Alain Delon : Jacques Batkin 
 Carla Gravina : Muriel Batkin 
 Charles Vanel : Jean Ritter
 Louis Julien : Eddy Batkin  
 Dora Doll : Ginette, Eddy's mother 
 Pierre Maguelon :  Police commissioner  Leoni 
 Suzanne Flon :  Widow  Grimaldi 
 Christian de Tillière : The judge
 Gérard Hérold : Vaulnet, the lawyer 
 Jacques Debary : President Lenoir
 Reinhard Kolldehoff : Feldman, the banker

References

External links

French crime drama films
1976 films
Films directed by José Giovanni
Films produced by Alain Delon
Films scored by Georges Delerue
Films with screenplays by José Giovanni
1970s French-language films
1970s French films
Italian crime drama films